Taunton Brewhouse (previously The Brewhouse) is the largest theatre and arts centre in Taunton, the county town of Somerset, England.

The building opened on 28 March 1977, on the banks of the River Tone, and offers a purpose-built 352-seat auditorium, a supporting 60-seat versatile studio space for performances, classes and conferences, and an exhibition space. It hosts a programme of live professional and amateur theatre productions; live folk, rock, and pop music; comedians; popular and independent cinema; live broadcasts from major international venues, such as London's National Theatre and The Royal Opera House; and visual arts exhibitions.

Its first professional production was Alan Ayckbourn’s The Norman Conquests, starring the then unknown David Jason.

Building 
The Westward Room and administrative offices reside in the Old Brewery house, a Georgian Grade II listed building, which gives the theatre its name.

The main house is a proscenium arch theatre with a trapezoidal apron, which can be reconfigured to include a central vomitorium, and includes a flexible orchestra pit.

Funding 
In 2005, Arts Council England announced that it would cut regular funding to The Brewhouse from 2006, following a drop in artistic output. In September 2005 a new director Robert Miles was appointed to lead the artistic re-invigoration of the organisation. It was also the first theatre, apart from the Royal Court Theatre, to stage Caryl Churchill's controversial play Seven Jewish Children.

In 2009, ongoing under funding, combined with the impact of recession and a subsequent threat of cuts meant the venue was once again put under threat of closure. With support from its stakeholders Taunton Brewhouse overcame these immediate funding concerns, and in March 2010 it was announced that the organisation had been awarded £487,500 from Arts Council England's Sustain fund to allow it to continue to programme arts and participatory activities during the economic downturn.

The venue closed in February 2013 and went into administration.

The venue reopened in April 2014 by independent arts charity Taunton Theatre Association Ltd (TTA), having been granted the lease from Taunton Deane Borough Council, who bought the 61-year lease of the site and its contents from administrator BDO. 

In 2020 Taunton Theatre Association were awarded a significant grant as part of the Government’s Culture Recovery Fund.

The venue now receives regular finding from Arts Council England and Somerset West and Taunton Council.

References

Theatres completed in 1977
Buildings and structures completed in 1977
Theatres in Somerset
Grade II listed buildings in Taunton Deane
Buildings and structures in Taunton